Vladyslav Levanidov (born 23 February 1993 in Kryvyi Rih, Ukraine), is a professional Ukrainian football goalkeeper who plays for Dinaz Vyshhorod.

He is the product of the RVUFK Kyiv sportive school. In summer 2011 he signed a contract with PFC Oleksandria. In 2009, he was called up for the Ukraine national under-17 football team, but did not play any games for this youth representation.

References

External links 

1993 births
Living people
Sportspeople from Kryvyi Rih
Ukrainian footballers
FC CSKA Kyiv players
FC Oleksandriya players
FC Volyn Lutsk players
FC Dinaz Vyshhorod players
FC Khust players
Association football goalkeepers
Ukrainian Premier League players